Paul Eugène Louis Deschanel (13 February 1855, in Schaerbeek28 April 1922) was a French politician. He served as President of France from 18 February to 21 September 1920.

Biography 
Paul Deschanel, the son of Émile Deschanel (1819–1904), professor at the Collège de France and senator, was born in Brussels, where his father was living in exile (1851–1859), owing to his opposition to Napoleon III. He is one of only two French Presidents (the other is Valéry Giscard d'Estaing) who were born outside France (Deschanel in Belgium, Giscard in Koblenz, Germany).

Education 
Paul Deschanel was schooled at the Collège Sainte-Barbe-des-Champs in Fontenay-aux-Roses, then at the Lycée Louis-le-Grand and the Lycée Condorcet in Paris. The family left Paris for several months in 1870–1871, due to the Siege of Paris. Deschanel completed his military service in the infantry in Paris in 1873, then studied at the École Libre des Sciences Politiques and the Faculty of Law of Paris, graduating with a baccalaureate in law in 1874 and a licentiate in law in 1875.

Early career 
He began his career as secretary to Deshayes de Marcère (1876) and to Jules Simon (1876–1877). In October 1885, he was elected deputy for Eure-et-Loir. From the first, he took an important place in the chamber, as one of the most notable orators of the Progressist Republican group. In January 1896, he was elected vice-president of the chamber, and henceforth devoted himself to the struggle against the Left, not only in parliament, but also in public meetings throughout France.

His addresses at Marseille on 26 October 1896, at Carmaux on 27 December 1896, and at Roubaix on 10 April 1897, were triumphs of clear and eloquent exposition of the political and social aims of the Progressist party.

In June 1898, he was elected president of the chamber, and was re-elected in 1901, but rejected in 1902. Nevertheless, he came forward brilliantly in 1904 and 1905 as a supporter of the law on the separation of church and state. He also gained a position on the Committee of Foreign Affairs, and was president of the committee when the Franco-German treaty of 1911 came before Parliament.

He was re-elected deputy in 1910, and on 23 May 1912 was chosen to be the President of the Chamber. In this role he played a great part during World War I as the national orator; he delivered orations more frequently than he made speeches. He served until he was elected President of France on 17 January 1920 by an overwhelming majority, having beaten Georges Clemenceau in the preliminary party ballot.

Presidency 

Deschanel aspired to a much more active role as president than had been de rigueur under the Third Republic; but, for reasons of his own mental health, was unable to put his ideas to the test.

As president, his eccentric behaviour caused some consternation; on one occasion, after a delegation of schoolgirls had presented him with a bouquet, he tossed the flowers back at them. It all culminated when, late one night, 24 May 1920, he fell out of a large window of the presidential train near Montargis after taking some sleeping pills and was found wandering in his nightshirt by a platelayer, who took him to the nearest level-crossing keeper's cottage. Soon afterwards, Deschanel walked out of a state meeting, straight into a lake, fully clothed. His resignation was offered on 21 September 1920, and he was placed in a sanatorium at Rueil-Malmaison for three months. After his release he was elected to the senate in January 1921, serving until his death from pneumonia.

Until the death penalty was abolished in 1981, he was the only French head of state during whose term in office no persons in France were executed. Deschanel himself was a longtime death penalty opponent.

Works 
Paul Deschanel was elected a member of the Académie française in 1899, his books being:
 La Question du Tonkin, Berger-Levrault (1883)
 La Politique française en Océanie : à propos du canal de Panama, Berger-Levrault (1884)
 Les Intérêts français dans l’océan Pacifique, Berger-Levrault (1888)
 Orateurs et Hommes d'État : Frédéric II et M. de Bismarck, Fox et Pitt, Lord Grey, Talleyrand, Berryer, Gladstone, Calmann-Lévy (1888)
 Figures littéraires : Renan, Paul Bourget, Sainte-Beuve, Edgar Quinet, Paul Dubois, Mignet, Diderot, Rabelais, Calmann-Lévy (1888)
 Figures de femmes : Madame du Deffand, Madame d'Épinay, Madame Necker, Madame de Beaumont, Madame Récamier, etc., Calmann-Lévy (1889)
 Questions actuelles : discours prononcés à la Chambre des députés, Hetzel (1890)
 La Décentralisation, Berger-Levrault (1895)
 La Question sociale, Calmann-Lévy (1898)
 La République nouvelle, Calmann-Lévy (1898)
 Quatre ans de présidence (1898–1902), Calmann-Lévy (1902)
 Politique intérieure et étrangère : la séparation, les retraites, la délation, l'anti-patriotisme, l'entente franco-anglaise, les affaires du Maroc, Calmann-Lévy (1906)
 À l’Institut, Calmann-Lévy (1907)
 L'Organisation de la démocratie, Fasquelle (1910)
 Hors des frontières, Fasquelle (1910)
 Paroles françaises, Fasquelle (1911)
 Les Commandements de la patrie, Bloud & Gay (1917)
 La France victorieuse : paroles de guerre, Fasquelle (1919)
 Gambetta, Hachette (1919)

References

External links 
 

 
 

|-
 

|-
 
 

1855 births
1922 deaths
20th-century presidents of France
20th-century Princes of Andorra
Burials at Montparnasse Cemetery
Democratic Republican Alliance politicians
French Senators of the Third Republic
Grand Croix of the Légion d'honneur
Lycée Condorcet alumni
Lycée Louis-le-Grand alumni
Members of the Académie Française
Presidents of the Chamber of Deputies (France)
Members of the 4th Chamber of Deputies of the French Third Republic
Members of the 5th Chamber of Deputies of the French Third Republic
Members of the 6th Chamber of Deputies of the French Third Republic
Members of the 7th Chamber of Deputies of the French Third Republic
Members of the 8th Chamber of Deputies of the French Third Republic
Members of the 9th Chamber of Deputies of the French Third Republic
Members of the 10th Chamber of Deputies of the French Third Republic
Members of the 11th Chamber of Deputies of the French Third Republic
Members of the 12th Chamber of Deputies of the French Third Republic
People from Schaerbeek
Senators of Eure-et-Loir
Deputies of Eure-et-Loir